Georgina Hale (born 4 August 1943) is an English film, television and stage actress. She is best known for her roles in the films of director Ken Russell, including The Devils (1971), The Boy Friend (1971), and Mahler (1974), for which she received a BAFTA Film Award. An accomplished stage actress, she received an Olivier Award nomination for her leading performance in Steaming (1981). She has appeared in a number of television plays, and in 2010, The Guardian listed her as one of 10 great character actors in British television. She remains active in film, television and theatre.

Life and early career
Hale was born in Ilford, Essex to publicans Elsie (née Fordham) and George Robert Hole. She later said she had:

As a teenager, she worked as an apprentice hairdresser and studied Stanislavski's method approach to acting at a fledgling studio, the Chelsea Actors' Workshop, in London, then she was accepted into the Royal Academy of Dramatic Art, where she graduated in 1965.

Acting career

Stage
An accomplished stage actress, Hale made her professional debut at Stratford as a walk-on. She appeared in repertory theatre at Canterbury, Windsor and Ipswich, then at the Playhouse, Liverpool in 1967, where her parts included the title role in Gigi and Juliet in Romeo and Juliet. At the Thorndike Theatre in Leatherhead in October 1975, she played Eliza Doolittle in Pygmalion, followed by an acclaimed portrayal of Nina in Chekhov's The Seagull at the Playhouse in July 1976, making her West End debut in the production when it transferred to the Duke of York's Theatre in August 1976. Other roles included Marie Caroline David in The Tribades (Hampstead Theatre Club, May 1978); Melanie in Boo Hoo (Open Space Theatre, July 1978); and Bobbi Michele in Neil Simon's Last of the Red Hot Lovers (Royal Exchange, Manchester, April 1979 – transferring to the Criterion Theatre in November 1979).

In 1981, Hale played the leading role of Josie in Nell Dunn's play Steaming at the Comedy Theatre in London and received a nomination for a 1981 Olivier Award. In 1982, she appeared with Annette Crosbie and Richard O'Callaghan in a production of Noël Coward's Star Quality at the Theatre Royal, Bath. In April 1983 she starred opposite Glenda Jackson and Gary Oldman in Summit Conference at the Lyric Theatre, London, playing Benito Mussolini's mistress Clara Petacci. Later that year, she starred with Colin Blakely, Jane Carr and Paul Eddington in the play Lovers Dancing, directed by Donald McWhinnie, at the Noël Coward Theatre. She followed with roles in two productions at The Old Vic: Aricia in Phédre (1984) and Crystal Allen in The Women (1985).

In 1991, Hale starred opposite Glenda Jackson in Mourning Becomes Electra by Eugene O'Neill,at the Glasgow Citizens Theatre. In 1993, she appeared in a production of Alan Ayckbourne's Absurd Person Singular at the Theatre Royal, Bath. In 1994, she appeared opposite Rupert Everett in a production of Tennessee Williams' The Milk Train Doesn't Stop Here Anymore at the Glasgow Citizens Theatre. In 1997, she appeared opposite Alan Bates in Life Support by Simon Gray at the Aldwych Theatre in London. Critic Sheridan Morley wrote in The New York Times that Hale, as the bed-bound Gwen, was "supremely touching even in almost total paralysis".

Other notable stage appearances include The Guardsman at the Noël Coward Theatre (2000), where critic Sheridan Morley noted that Hale added "superbly timed comic support", Semi-Monde at the Lyric Theatre (2001), Britannicus and as Madame Ranevsky in The Cherry Orchard at the Glasgow Citizens Theatre (both 2002), and Chéri and Take a Chance on Me at the New End Theatre (both 2003).

Hale's most recent stage role was that of Nell in a production of Samuel Beckett's Endgame at the Gate Theatre, Dublin and then the Barbican Centre, London, as part of the Beckett Centenary Festival in May 2006.

Film
Hale made her film debut in the historical drama Eagle in a Cage (1971) as Betsy Balcombe, opposite Kenneth Haigh as Napoléon Bonaparte. In his review for The New York Times, film critic Roger Greenspun noted that, at age 24, Hale displayed "a kind of mature intensity that argues for at least 30 years' experience on the stage".

Hale appeared as Alma Mahler in Ken Russell's Mahler (1974), opposite Robert Powell as Gustav Mahler. Her performance was called "excellent" by both Time Out and Radio Times, and earned her the 1975 BAFTA Award for Most Promising Newcomer to Leading Film Roles. In his review for Film Comment, critic Stephen Farber wrote:

Hale also made appearances in a number of Russell's other films, with roles in The Devils (1971), The Boy Friend (1971), Lisztomania (1975), Valentino (1977), and Treasure Island (1995). Russell later referred to Hale as "an actress of such sensitivity that she can make the hair rise on your arms".

Hale played a supporting role in the romantic drama The World is Full of Married Men (1979), based on the novel of the same name by Jackie Collins. Variety noted that Hale was "effective as a laconic wife who’s come to terms with the sexcess scene".

Hale had a small role in the film The Watcher in the Woods (1980), starring Bette Davis. Hale took the role of the younger version of Davis' character largely because of her admiration for Davis.

Her other film appearances include supporting roles in Butley (1974), Sweeney 2 (1978), McVicar (1980), Castaway (1986), Preaching to the Perverted (1997), Mrs Palfrey at the Claremont (2005), and Cockneys vs Zombies (2011).

Television
Hale's television career spans six decades. Her first major television appearances were supporting roles in plays filmed for The Wednesday Play, ITV Playhouse and ITV Play of the Week. Recurring roles in primetime series followed, first opposite Adam Faith in the second series of Budgie (1972) as his wayward wife, and then as Lili Dietrich in the miniseries The Strauss Family (1972).

In 1973, she starred in A.D.A.M. as a physically disabled woman who develops an unusual relationship with the sentient computer system that controls her home. Directed by Michael Lindsay-Hogg, the drama was broadcast as part of the ITV Sunday Night Drama anthology strand. In 1975, Hale appeared in two television plays written by Simon Gray, broadcast as part of the ITV series Play for Today. These were Plaintiffs and Defendants and Two Sundays. In 1978, Hale appeared with Michael Gambon in the BBC Play of the Month adaptation of Anton Chekhov's The Seagull. In 1980, Hale portrayed Ruth Ellis, the last woman to be hanged in the UK, in an episode of the drama series Ladykillers.

In 1990, Hale succeeded Elizabeth Estensen in the eponymous role of T-Bag, the villainous, tea-drinking sorceress in a succession of children's adventure series produced by Thames Television. Hale played the role in four series and two Christmas specials broadcast between 1990 and 1992.

In December 1992, Hale appeared in two television plays produced by Simon Curtis, broadcast as part of the anthology series Performance. These were Luigi Pirandello's Six Characters in Search of an Author and Terence Rattigan's After the Dance.

In 1994, Hale appeared in the sitcom pilot The Honeymoon's Over, written by Paul Whitehouse and Charlie Higson, broadcast as part of the Comic Asides anthology strand on BBC Two.

In 2007, Hale made a guest appearance in the crime drama The Commander. Television critic Nancy Banks-Smith noted in The Guardian that Hale "was able to do wonders with a mere sliver of a scene".

Other notable television appearances include guest starring roles in Upstairs, Downstairs (1975), Minder (1980), Hammer House of Horror (1980), the Doctor Who serial The Happiness Patrol (1988), One Foot in the Grave (1990), Murder Most Horrid (1994), The Bill (2002), Emmerdale (2006), Hollyoaks (2010–2011), Crime Stories (2012) and Holby City (2016).

Work

Film

Television

Theatre

Notes

References

Further reading
Who's Who in the Theatre, 17th edition, Gale (1981)

External links

Georgina Hale portrait by photographer Rachel Lum
Georgina Hale Interview

 
|-
! colspan="3" style="background:#daa520;" | BAFTA Award
|-

1943 births
Alumni of RADA
BAFTA Most Promising Newcomer to Leading Film Roles winners
English film actresses
English stage actresses
English television actresses
Living people
People from Ilford